The European Economic and Trade Office (EETO) is the representative office of European Union (EU) in Taiwan. Its counterpart body in the EU is the Taipei Representative Office in the EU and Belgium. The European Union does not have diplomatic ties with the Republic of China (Taiwan) and only maintains informal relations with it.

History
The office was established on 10 March 2003 by the European Commission (Prodi Commission).

Organizational structure
 Trade Section
 Press and Information Section
 Administration Section

Transportation
The office is accessible within walking distance north west of Taipei 101 / World Trade Center Station of the Taipei Metro.

See also
 List of diplomatic missions in Taiwan
 List of diplomatic missions of the European Union
 Foreign relations of Taiwan

References

2003 establishments in Taiwan
Representative Offices in Taipei
Taiwan
Taiwan–European Union relations